Luka Pejović (Cyrillic: Лука Пејовић; born 31 July 1985) is a Montenegrin international footballer.

Club career
After starting his senior career at FK Crvena Stijena, Pejović played for OFK Grbalj for one year then was bought by FK Mogren in 2007. He won Best Montenegrin Footballer in the league award for the year 2007, alongside ex teammate Aleksandar Nedović. He was also part of Mogren team that won the National Championship in the 2008–09 season.

In January 2011, he joined Polish club Jagiellonia Białystok on four and a half year contract.
In January 2017 he made a deal with Montenegrin club FK Iskra Danilovgrad and he was a third player to come in this club (after Miroje Jovanović and Semir Agović).

International career
Pejović made his debut for Montenegro against Japan on 1 June 2007 as Montenegro lost 2–0. He has earned a total of 23 caps, scoring 1 goal. His final international was a February 2012 friendly match against Iceland.

References

External links
 
 
 Profile

1985 births
Living people
Footballers from Podgorica
Association football fullbacks
Serbia and Montenegro footballers
Montenegrin footballers
Montenegro international footballers
FK Crvena Stijena players
OFK Grbalj players
FK Mogren players
Jagiellonia Białystok players
OFK Titograd players
FK Iskra Danilovgrad players
FK Lovćen players
Second League of Serbia and Montenegro players
Montenegrin First League players
Ekstraklasa players
Montenegrin Second League players
Montenegrin expatriate footballers
Expatriate footballers in Poland
Montenegrin expatriate sportspeople in Poland